{{Infobox boxing match
| image        = 
| caption      = 
| fight date   = June 23, 2001
| Fight Name   = The Quest
| location     = MGM Grand Garden Arena, Paradise, Nevada, U.S.
| titles       = WBC super welterweight title
| fighter2     = Javier Castillejo
| purse2       = $800,000
| nickname2    = El Lince de Parla(The Lynx of Parla)
| record2      = 51–4 (34 KO)
| height2      = 5 ft 11 in
| weight2      = 154 pounds
| style2       = Orthodox
| hometown2    = Parla, Madrid, Spain
| recognition2 = WBC super welterweight champion
| fighter1     = Oscar De La Hoya
| purse1       = $5,000,000
| nickname1    = The Golden Boy
| record1      = 33–2 (27 KO)
| hometown1    = East Los Angeles, California, U.S.
| height1      = 5 ft 10+1/2 in
| weight1      = 154 pounds
| style1     = Orthodox
| recognition1 = [[The Ring (magazine)|The Ring]] No. 4 ranked pound-for-pound fighter4-division world champion
| result =  De La Hoya wins via 12-round unanimous decision (119-108, 119-108, 119-108)
}}
Oscar De La Hoya vs. Javier Castillejo, billed as The Quest'', was a super welterweight professional boxing match that took place on June 23, 2001 at the MGM Grand Garden Arena in Paradise, Nevada. After 12 rounds, De La Hoya defeated Castillejo to take the WBC super welterweight title. With his win, De La Hoya then tied with Sugar Ray Leonard and Thomas Hearns as a five-division world champion.

Filipino boxer Manny Pacquiao makes his debut in the United States with his bout against Lehlohonolo Ledwaba.

Background
Javier Castillejo, aged 33, was considered the underdog before his fight with 28-year-old Oscar De La Hoya, with the latter at his prime both "physically and emotionally".

Fight
De La Hoya won the bout via unanimous decision, with all three judges scoring the fight 119–108 in his favor.

Preliminary card

Lehlohonolo Ledwaba vs. Manny Pacquiao
Filipino Manny Pacquiao defeated South African Lehlohonolo Ledwaba via technical knockout for the IBF junior featherweight title.

The eight-round fight is generally considered as a significant event for both boxers' careers. At the time, Ledwaba had been ranked as one of the top pound-for-pound boxers, and was scheduled for a bout with Mexican Enrique Sánchez. However, Sanchez was injured two weeks before the undercard bout, and matchmaker Sampson Lewkowicz replaced him with Pacquiao, who would thus have his debut in the U.S.. The fight also became the first match of Pacquiao to have Freddie Roach as his coach.

Ledwaba considered the bout to be the most difficult fight in his career. He remarked that during the bout, he "tried almost everything. I'm a boxer who used to think. I always tried to outwork an opponent, but it was totally different against Manny. [...] I was flat-footed, but he was on his toes all the time, so he was hard to hit." His promoter Rodney Berman later expressed the thought that Ledwaba's defeat to the then-unknown Pacquiao caused him to lose motivation in boxing; Ledwaba did not have anymore world level fights after the match, and retired from the profession by 2006. For Pacquiao, he won $40,000 for his victory, and later stated that alongside his other early fights, he fondly remembers his fight against Ledwaba because "[t]hat's the one that got me here to the U.S. and after that my career really started."

Other fights

 Jermain Taylor defeats  Marvin Smith via unanimous decision.

References

2001 in boxing
Boxing in Las Vegas
Boxing matches involving Manny Pacquiao
Boxing matches involving Oscar De La Hoya
June 2001 sports events in the United States